Maciej Steinhof (born 14 November 1985 in Kraków) is a Polish racing driver. He won the ADAC Volkswagen Polo Cup series in 2009.

References

External links
 Maciek Steinhof official website
 

1985 births
Living people
Polish racing drivers
Sportspeople from Kraków